The canton of Louhans is an administrative division of the Saône-et-Loire department, eastern France. Its borders were modified at the French canton reorganisation which came into effect in March 2015. Its seat is in Louhans.

It consists of the following communes:
 
Branges
Bruailles
La Chapelle-Naude
Le Fay
Juif
Louhans
Montagny-près-Louhans
Montcony
Montret
Ratte
Sagy
Saint-André-en-Bresse
Saint-Étienne-en-Bresse
Saint-Martin-du-Mont
Saint-Usuge
Saint-Vincent-en-Bresse
Simard
Sornay
Vérissey
Vincelles

References

Cantons of Saône-et-Loire